"Niton (The Reason)" is a single by Swedish DJ and producer, Eric Prydz. It was released by digital download on 6 February 2011 on Ministry of Sound. The music video was uploaded to YouTube on 9 December 2010. On 13 February 2011 the song entered the UK Singles Chart at number 45.

Critical reception
Robert Copsey of Digital Spy gave the song a positive review stating:

Nobody does elusive DJ/producer better than Eric Prydz. Not only does he take yonks between albums singles, but he also goes by no fewer than nine separate monikers - our favourite being the oh-so macho 'Dukes of Sluca'. However, three years after his hypnotic instrumental hit 'Pjanoo', Prydz is returning under his familiar guise, seemingly eager to regain his place amidst today's Eurodance boffs.

After beginning in jangly electronic fashion, 'Niton' soon becomes a suitably uplifting techno-house rocket powered by a piano riff not too dissimilar to 'Pjanoo's'. Thankfully, the addition of bassy synths, thrilling electronic whooshes and surprisingly thoughtful lyrics ensure that this not only sounds bang-on-trend - but, just as importantly, nothing like a certain Gallic knob-twiddler with a very public affection for party jams.

Track listing

Chart performance

Release history

References

2011 singles
Eric Prydz songs
2010 songs
Songs written by Eric Prydz
Ministry of Sound singles